Roland Riese (born 29 July 1960 in Neuenhaus, Lower Saxony) is a German politician that belongs to the Free Democratic Party.

He was elected to the Lower Saxon Landtag in 2003, and has been re-elected on one occasion.

Riese holds a master's degree in Business administration from the University of West Florida. He is member of the Beta Gamma Sigma Society.

References

External links

1960 births
Living people
People from Bentheim
Free Democratic Party (Germany) politicians
Members of the Landtag of Lower Saxony